Seah Jim Quee was a prominent contractor in Johor, Malaya.  He held the Kangchu concession for the kampung of Batu Tiga Belas.

He held a large piece of land near Bukit Chagar and Jalan Lumba Kuda. Jalan Jim Quee, a road near Bukit Chagar, is named after him. Little is known about his private life but he had 7 sons and 1 daughter. His fourth son is Seah Neo Chow. His sixth son is Seah Neo Buan. His seventh son is Seah Neo Cheng (4 July 1895 - 24 May 1963).

References

External links
MapCarta: Location of Batu Tiga Belas
 佘任桂 Persekutuan Tiong-hua Johor Baru

People from Johor Bahru
Malaysian people of Chinese descent